Anaivari is a village in the Cuddalore District of the Indian state Tamil Nadu. One of The fastest developing village in Cuddalore District. Anaivari is located near Sethiyathope, which is the nearest panchayat town. Chidambaram is its nearest town.

AgriCulture
It is Agriculture dependent Village. Main Agriculture crops are Paddy and Suger Cane.

School
Panchayat Union Elementary School

Temples 
One of the famous Kali Amman temple placed in Anaivari Mettu Stree and Veeranar, Pillaiyar, Aiyanar, Karuppannaswamy Temple

References

Villages in Cuddalore district